"Two to the Power of Love" is a duet between Janet Jackson and Cliff Richard and was the second single released from Dream Street. It peaked at No. 83 in the United Kingdom and No. 7 in South Africa. This was Jackson's first single to enter the top 100 and top 10 of those countries respectively.

Jackson performed the song with Jesse Borrego in season four of the television series Fame.

Charts

References 

1984 singles
Cliff Richard songs
Janet Jackson songs
Male–female vocal duets
Song recordings produced by Giorgio Moroder
Song recordings produced by Pete Bellotte
Songs written by Peter Beckett
A&M Records singles
1984 songs
Songs written by Steve Kipner